This is a list of aircraft in alphabetical order beginning with 'U'.

U

UAC 
(See: Antonov, Ilyushin, Irkut Corporation, Mikoyan, Sukhoi, Tupolev and Yakovlev)

UCA 
(Universal Composite Aviation)
 UCA Carbon Bird

UCC
(United Consultant Corp, Norwood, MA)
 UCC UC-1 Twin Bee

Udet 
(Udet Flugzeugbau)
 Udet U 1
 Udet U 2
 Udet U 3 Project
 Udet U 4
 Udet U 5
 Udet U 6
 Udet U 7 Kolibri
 Udet U 8 "Limousine"
 Udet U 9
 Udet U 10
 Udet U 11 Kondor
 Udet U 12 "Flamingo"
 Udet U 13 "Bayern"

UDRD
(Universal Dynamics Research & Development)
 UDRD Defiant 300

Uetz 
(Walter Uetz Flugzeugbau)
 Uetz U2-MFGZ a modified Jodel D.119 with a Jodel-designed wing, one built.
 Uetz U2V a modified Jodel D.119 with a new wing.
 Uetz U3M Pelikan
 Uetz U4M Pelikan

UFAG 
(Ungarische Flugzeugfabrik Abteil Gesellschaft / Ungarische Flugzeugwerke Aktien Gesellschaft)
Note: UFAG were allocated 60 series numbers for experimental and prototype aircraft.
 UFAG 60.01
 UFAG 60.02 (D.I)
 UFAG 60.03 (C.II)
 UFAG series 160 - Hansa-Brandenburg C.II(U)
 UFAG series 61 - Hansa-Brandenburg C.I(U)  - Austro-Daimler 210hp (160 kW) engine
 UFAG series 161 - UFAG C.I
 UFAG series 62 - Hansa-Brandenburg G.I(U) 
 UFAG series 63 - Hansa-Brandenburg C.I(U) - 120 kW (160 hp) Mercedes D.IIIs
 UFAG series 64 - Hansa-Brandenburg C.I(U) - Austro-Daimler 210 hp (160 kW) engine
 UFAG series 66 - Hansa-Brandenburg C.II(U)
 UFAG series 67 - Hansa-Brandenburg C.I(U)  - Austro-Daimler 210 hp (160 kW) engine
 UFAG series 68 - Hansa-Brandenburg C.I(U) - Austro-Daimler 210 hp (160 kW) engine
 UFAG series 69 - Hansa-Brandenburg C.I(U) - 150 kW (200 hp) Hiero V-8?
 UFAG series 169 - Hansa-Brandenburg C.I(U) - with 160 kW (220 hp) Benz Bz.IVas
 UFAG series 269 - Hansa-Brandenburg C.I(U) - Austro-Daimler 210 hp (150 kW) engine
 UFAG series 369 - Hansa-Brandenburg C.I(U) - 170 kW (230 hp) Hiero 6
 UFAG C.I
 UFAG C.II
 UFAG D.I

UL-Jih 
(UL-Jih Sedláĉek Spol s.r.o.)
 UL-Jih E80 Evolution
 UL-Jih E100 Evolution
 UL-Jih F80 Fascination
 UL-Jih F100 Fascination

UFM 
 UFM Easy Riser
 UFM Mauro Solar Riser

UFO
(Geoff Price, P.O. Box 15, Whitford, Auckland 2149, New Zealand )
 UFO HeliThruster

ULBI
(Ultraleicht Bau International GmbH, Hassfurt, Germany)
ULBI WT01 Wild Thing
ULBI WT02 Wild Thing

Ullmann 
 Ullmann 2000 Panther

Ultimate Aircraft
(Ultimate Aircraft Corporation, Canada)
 Ultimate Aircraft 10 Dash 100
 Ultimate Aircraft 10 Dash 200
 Ultimate Aircraft 10 Dash 300
 Ultimate Aircraft 20 Dash 300
 Ultimate Aircraft Special

Ultimate Flight Designs
(Ultimate Flight Designs, Mounds, OK)
Ultimate Jetwing

Ultra-Efficient Products
Ultra-Efficient Products Invader

Ultra-Fab
Ultra-Fab Sundowner

Ultra-Leicht Flugtechnik
(Braunschweig, Germany)
Ultra-Leicht Flugtechnik Speedy Mouse

Ultracraft
(Heusden-Zolder, Belgium)
Ultracraft Calypso

Ultraflight
(Ultraflight Sales Limited)
Ultraflight Lazair
Ultraflight Lazair Series I
Ultraflight Lazair Series II
Ultraflight Lazair Series III
Ultraflight Lazair Elite
Ultraflight Lazair II
Ultraflight Lazair SS
Ultraflight Electric Lazair

Ultralight Design
(Cvikov, Česká Lípa District, Liberec Region, Czech Republic)
Ultralight Design Atos Trike

Ultralight Flight
(Ultralight Flight Inc.)
Ultralight Flight Mirage

Ultraleve
 Ultraleve Fox
 Ultraleve Coyote

Ultralite Soaring
(Ultralite Soaring Inc)
Ultralite Soaring Wizard W1
Ultralite Soaring Wizard J2
Ultralite Soaring Wizard J-3
Ultralite Soaring Wizard J-3 Magnum
Ultralite Soaring Wizard T3

Ultravia 
(Ultravia Aero Inc.)
 Ultravia Longnose Pelican
 Ultravia Le Pelican
 Ultravia Super Pelican
 Ultravia Pelican Club
 Ultravia Pelican PL
 Ultravia Pelican Sport
 Ultravia Pelican Sport 600
 Ultravia Pelican Tutor
 Ultravia Flyer Super Sport (Flyer SS)
 Ultravia Pelican AULA 600

Umbaugh 
( (Raymond E) Umbaugh Aircraft Corp, Ocala, FL)
 Umbaugh U-17
 Umbaugh U-18

Umeda 
(Yuzo Umeda)
 Umeda 1910 Aeroplane

Umino 
(Ikunosuke Umino)
 Umino Seaplane

Union
(Union Aircraft Co, Long Island, NY)
 Union Rotorplane

Union
(Union-Flugzeugwerke G.m.b.H)
 Union arrow biplane
 Union G.I

UNIS
(Unis Obchodni spol. s.r.o.)
 UNIS 40 Bongo

United
(Tips & Smith Inc (engines), Houston, TX)
 United 1927 Biplane

United
(United Aircraft Corp (Pres: Curtis C Baldwin), on acquisition of Lark Aircraft Co, 471 W 1st St, Wichita, KS)
 United Lark
 UAC Special

United Consultants
(United Consultants Corporation)
 United Consultants Twin Bee

United Eastern
(United Eastern Aeroplane Co, 1251 DeKalb Ave, Brooklyn, NY)
 United Eastern A-M Tractor

United Helicopters
(United Helicopters inc.)
 United Helicopters C-4 Commuter

Universal
(Universal Aircraft Co, Fort Worth, TX)
 Universal 98 Trainer

Universal
Meteor
 Model H 
 Model H Special
 Model 201
 Model 275
 Model 5
 Monocoupe Model 22
 Monocoupe Model 70
 Model 90
 Model 110 Special
 Monocoupe Model 113
 Monocoupe Model 125
 Monocoupe Model D-145
Monoprep
 Model 90
 Model 218
Monosport
 Model 1
 Model 2
 Model D
 Model G
 Model G Deluxe
 Model 1344

Universal
Universal American Flea Ship

University of Berlin

 Berlin B.9

University of Maryland
(University of Maryland)
 University of Maryland Gamera Human Powered Helicopter

University of Minnesota
(University of Minnesota, Minneapolis, MN)
 University of Minnesota T-1

University of Toronto Institute for Aerospace Studies
(UTIAS)
 UTIAS Ornithopter No.1
 UTIAS SHARP

Unruh-Albright
(Marion Unruh & George Albright, Falls Church, VA)
 Unruh-Albright Pretty Prairie Special I
 Unruh-Albright Pretty Prairie Special II
 Unruh-Albright Pretty Prairie Special III

UP International
(Garmisch-Partenkirchen, Germany)
UP Ascent
UP Blues
UP Boogie
UP Cab
UP Comet
UP Condor
UP Dragonfly
UP Edge
UP Escape
UP Flash
UP Gambit
UP Gamit
UP Groove
UP Jazz
UP K2
UP Kantana
UP Kantega
UP Katana
UP Kendo
UP Kuna
UP Makalu
UP Pickup
UP Pico
UP Pulse
UP Rock
UP Sherpa
UP Soul
UP Stellar
UP Summit
UP Targa
UP Trango
UP TRX
UP Vision
UP Xpress

Urban Air
 Urban Air Lambada
 Urban Air Samba

URMV-3 
(Uzinele de Reparatii Material Volant-3)
 URMV-3 MR-2
 URMV-3 IAR 813
 URMV-3 IAR 814
 URMV-3 IAR 817
 URMV-3 RM-12

Urness-Hanson
(Alfred H Urness & Henry J Hanson, Cashton, WI)
 Urness-Hanson Toadstabber

Ursinus 
 Ursinus Seaplane Retractactable Float

US Aircraft
(US Aircraft Corporation)
 US Aircraft A-67 Dragon

U S Flyer
(U S Airplane Co, 3670 Milwaukee Ave, Chicago, IL)
 U S Flyer 1928 Biplane
 U S Flyer C-1
 U S Flyer C-2

US Aviation
 US Aviation Cumulus
 US Aviation Super Floater
 US Aviation CAVU
 US Aviation Cloud Dancer

US Light Aircraft 
 US Light Aircraft Hornet

USAF 
 USAF TR-3 Black Manta

U-Turn
(Villingen-Schwenningen, Germany)
U-Turn Annapurna
U-Turn Blacklight
U-Turn Blackout
U-Turn Emotion
U-Turn Eternity
U-Turn Everest
U-Turn Evolution
U-Turn Infinity
U-Turn Lightning
U-Turn Paramotion
U-Turn Passenger
U-Turn Redout
U-Turn Trinity
U-Turn Twinforce

Utva 
(Fabrika Aviona Utva: Utva Aircraft Industry) (Serbian: Utva - Wild Duck)
 Utva Aero 3
 Utva Lasta ("Swallow")
 Utva C-3 Trojka
 Utva 56
 Utva 60
 UTVA-65 Privrednik I: based on UTVA-60 as agricultural aircraft
 Utva 66
 UTVA-67 Privrednik II
 UTVA-70
 UTVA-71
 Utva 75A11 Ag version
 Utva 75A21 2-seater
 Utva 75A41 4-seater
 Utva 78
 UTVA-81
 UTVA-84
 UTVA-85
 Utva 96
 Utva 212 
 Utva 213 Vihor ("Whirlwind") 
 Utva Kobac
 UTVA-95 Lasta: two seat primary/basic trainer and light attack aircraft
 UTVA N-62 Super Galeb: light attack advanced jet trainer

See also
 List of jet airliners

References

Further reading

External links

 List of aircraft (U)